Dorcadion boucardi is a species of beetle in the family Cerambycidae. It was described by Pic in 1942. It is known from Syria.

References

boucardi
Beetles described in 1942